Your Life on the Lawn is an Australian lifestyle television program, which screened on the Seven Network in 2003. The series transforms the homes and lives of those who have found themselves in mess and clutter. The series featured Pascall Fox, Simon Fenner and Lissanne Oliver.

See also
 Space Invaders
 List of Australian television series

References

Seven Network original programming
2003 Australian television series debuts